The 1977–78 Divizia C was the 22nd season of Liga III, the third tier of the Romanian football league system.

Team changes

To Divizia C
Relegated from Divizia B
 Unirea Focșani
 Flacăra-Automecanica Moreni
 Sticla Arieșul Turda
 Borzești
 Voința București
 Rapid Arad
 Minerul Gura Humorului
 Șantierul Naval Oltenița
 IS Câmpia Turzii
 Olimpia Râmnicu Sărat
 Tehnometal București
 Minerul Cavnic

Promoted from County Championship
 Zimbrul Suceava
 Siretul Bucecea
 Aripile Bacău
 Flacăra Murgeni
 Chimpex Constanța
 Oțelul Galați
 Granitul Babadag
 Petrolul Băicoi
 Petrolul Berca
 Victoria Lehliu
 Mecanică Fină București
 Automobilul Curtea de Argeș
 Electrodul Slatina
 Constructorul Târgu Jiu
 Mecanizatorul Șimian
 Minerul Oravița
 Minerul Vulcan
 Minerul Ilba-Seini
 Rapid Jibou
 Oțelul Reghin
 CM Cluj-Napoca
 Hebe Sângeorz-Băi
 IUPS Miercurea Ciuc
 Carpați Mârșa

From Divizia C
Promoted to Divizia B
 CS Botoșani
 Viitorul Vaslui
 Carpați Sinaia
 Tulcea
 Autobuzul București
 Muscelul Câmpulung
 Pandurii Târgu Jiu
 Minerul Moldova Nouă
 Victoria Carei
 Avântul Reghin
 ICIM Brașov
 Gaz Metan Mediaș

Relegated to County Championship
 Danubiana Roman
 Foresta Moldovița
 Hușana Huși
 Textila Buhuși
 Recolta Săhăteni
 Metalosport Galați
 Șantierul Naval Constanța
 Gloria Poarta Albă
 Viitorul Chirnogi
 Olimpia Giurgiu
 Răsăritul Caracal
 Oțelul Târgoviște
 Laminorul IPA Slatina
 Dunărea Calafat
 Ceramica Jimbolia
 Banatul Timișoara
 Gloria Șimleu Silvaniei
 Victoria Zalău
 Cimentul Turda
 Minerul Borșa
 Mureșul Toplița
 Măgura Codlea
 CIL Blaj
 Textila Sebeș

Renamed teams 
Chimia Mărășești was renamed as Demar Mărășești.

Dunărea Tulcea was renamed as Pescărușul Tulcea.

Dunărea Cernavodă was renamed as Șoimii Cernavodă.

Forestierul Târgu Secuiesc was renamed as Metalul Târgu Secuiesc.

Unirea Sfântu Gheorghe was renamed as CPL Sfântu Gheorghe.

FIL Orăștie was renamed as IM Orăștie.

Laminorul Teliuc was renamed as Metalul Hunedoara.

Other changes 
Unirea Siret took the place of Progresul Fălticeni.

League tables

Seria I

Seria II

Seria III

Seria IV

Seria V

Seria VI

Seria VII

Seria VIII

Seria IX

Seria X

Seria XI

Seria XII

See also 
 1977–78 Divizia A
 1977–78 Divizia B
 1977–78 County Championship

References 

Liga III seasons
3
Romania